King's War, also known as Legend of Chu and Han, is a Chinese television series based on the events in the Chu–Han Contention, an interregnum between the fall of the Qin dynasty and the founding of the Han dynasty. It started airing on Anhui TV, Zhejiang TV, Jiangxi TV and Tianjin TV on 28 December 2012.

The show began streaming on Netflix in 2017.

Cast

 Chen Daoming as Liu Bang
 Peter Ho as Xiang Yu
 Duan Yihong as Han Xin
 Qin Lan as Lü Zhi
 Li Yixiao as Consort Yu
 Yang Lixin as Xiao He
 Sun Haiying as Fan Zeng
 Huo Qing as Zhang Liang
 Zhang Jinyuan as Chen Ping
 Liu Yuxin as Concubine Qi
 Hu Dong as Ying Bu
 Wang Xinjun as Peng Yue
 You Yong as Yong Chi
 Kang Kai as Fan Kuai 
 Wang Jishi as Lu Wan
 Fan Yulin as Long Ju
 Zhang Chenghao as Zhou Bo
 Xu Xiaojian as Cao Shen
 Lin Peng as Xiahou Ying
 Jiang Yongbo as Cao Wushang
 Yu Hewei as Qin Shi Huang
 Yu Bin as Qin Er Shi
 Chi Dong as Han Sheng
 Li Yuan as Ji Bu
 Li Yixin as Zhao Chuiluan
 Zheng Wei as Liu Ying
 Yu Mingjia as Lady Cao
 Cai Yida as Xiang Zhuang
 Qiu Yunhe as Xiang Di
 Yang Ziduo as Yu Ziqi
 Zhu Yanping as Xiang Liang
 Xu Maomao as Xiang Bo
 Ye Dingming as Fusu
 Ji Chenmu as King Huai of Chu
 Cao Weiyu as Zhang Han
 Miao Luoyi as Liyuan
 Gong Yirong as Ruojiang
 Liu Xiaoxiao as Jitao
 Wang Zitong as Emei
 Ye Peng as Zhongli Mo
 Elvis Tsui as Wei Bao
 Li Jianxin as Li Si
 Xu Wenguang as Zhao Gao
 Wang Shengnan as Xiaoyi
 Wu Gang as Shen Yiji
 Li Jichun as Ziying
 Shang Yue as Song Xiang
 Liao Jianheng as Liu Fei
 Sun Erchen as Li Si's youngest son

Production

King's War is the second historical drama television series directed by Gao Xixi, after Three Kingdoms (2010). The production cost for King's War was expected to break records, as Bona Film Group announced on 8 June 2011 that it would provide Gao Xixi with a budget of 1.7 billion yuan for the project, excluding the costs for possible future expansions.

Filming started on 25 August 2011 and ended on 5 May 2012.

Set construction
According to reports, apart from its huge budget, one of the highlights of the series is its realistic sets. The palace, along with other important locations in the television series, had to be totally reconstructed in accordance with the requirements stated in the script. The sets were expected to be completed by July 2011.

Casting
Chen Daoming formally signed on to play Liu Bang, one of the lead roles in the drama. On 25 August 2011, Gao Xixi appeared in public with six confirmed members of the cast, including Chen Daoming, Peter Ho, Hu Dong and Liu Yuxin. Chen Daoming had been confirmed to play Liu Bang while Peter Ho was a likely choice for the role of Xiang Yu.

Script
Screenwriter Wang Peigong spent years creating the script for King's War. Gao Xixi said in an interview, "Peigong and I would discuss about King's War when we have time. It has been four years, I believe the time is ripe now. The story will begin from Liu Bang starting off as a patrol officer in Pei County, until he established the Han dynasty and became the emperor. This series will not follow the narrative style of historical dramas. The clever part about Legend of Chu and Han lies in the word Legend."

English dub
On 15 August 2015, an English dub of all 80 episodes was completed for release on South African Cable Television.

Reception
The series received average ratings, but Gao Xixi claimed that it was attracting a highly educated audience.

Awards and nominations

International broadcast

References

External links
 

2012 Chinese television series debuts
Television series set in the Western Han dynasty
Television series set in the Qin dynasty
Zhejiang Television original programming
Chinese historical television series